Dellys is a town and commune in Algeria.

It may also refer to:

Places
 Dellys District, a district in Algeria.
 Casbah of Dellys, an old town in Algeria.

History
 Shipwreck of Dellys, a shipwreck in 1830 of French ships in the town of Dellys during French conquest of Algeria.
 First Assault of Dellys, an occupation in 1837 of the town of Dellys during French conquest of Algeria.
 Second Assault of Dellys, an occupation in 1844 of the town of Dellys during French conquest of Algeria.
 2007 Dellys bombing, a terrorist attack in Algeria.

People
 Dellys Starr, an Australian mountain biker.